Nathaniel Hall, better known by his stage name Afrika Baby Bam, is an American hip hop artist, born in Brooklyn, New York, and was part of the hip-hop group the Jungle Brothers. He was named in honor of Afrika Bambaataa. He is also known as Afrika, Baby Bam, and most recently B.A.M. He now travels the world as a nomad.

Music career
Bam started out as a member of the Jungle Brothers. The group was formed in 1986 with his friends from Brooklyn, Mike G and Sammy B. Their first hit was "Straight out the Jungle" followed by the dance music hit "I’ll House You." Bam also helped form the hip-hop super group Native Tongues whose members included Queen Latifah and Q-Tip. The Jungle Brothers' first concert was at Wembley Stadium to celebrate Nelson Mandela’s release from prison.

Solo career
Bam has most recently been performing in Massachusetts while he has been establishing his new production company, Ravensclaw Productions. He is also associated with a new movement called the Pagan Society. He has deviated from the traditional hip-hop community to establish himself as an artist involving himself in many collaborations including musical, video and art.
In 2014 and 2015, he released an EP and album with Austrian producer Mr. Dero.

Discography
Straight out the Jungle (1988), Idlers/Warlock
Done by the Forces of Nature (1989), Warner Bros.
J Beez Wit the Remedy (1993), Warner Bros.
Raw Deluxe (1997), Gee Street/V2/BMG Records
V.I.P. (2000), Gee Street/V2/BMG Records
All That We Do (2002), Jungle Brothers
You in My Hut Now (2003), XYZ
 This Is... (Greatest hits) (2005), Nurture Records/Groove
 I Got You (2006), Pinoeer Records
 Aquella Cosa (2013) Pagan Society
 This & That (2015), as Bam & Mr. Dero, Tiefparterre Records Graz
 The Music Saves Me (2018), as Ali B feat. Baby Bam, Bombstrikes

Acting career
In addition to his hip-hop career, Hall has an acting career under his birth name of Nathaniel Hall. One of his most notable roles was playing Baker Moon in the feature film Livin' Large.

References

External links
 An Interview w/ Afrika Baby Bam
 Straight out the Valley
 Bam & Mr.Dero Artist Page
 *

Rappers from Brooklyn
Living people
1970 births
21st-century American rappers